Nhạc đỏ or literally "Red Music" is the common name of the  revolutionary music (nhạc cách mạng) genre in Vietnam. This genre of music began soon after the beginning of the 20th century during the French colonial period, advocating for independence, socialism and anti-colonialism. Red Music was later strongly promoted across  North Vietnam during the War, to urge Northerners to achieve reunification under the Workers' Party of North Vietnam and fight against the "American imperialist puppet" in South Vietnam. Other forms of non-traditional, non-Revolutionary music and culture in the North, like Vietnamese popular music and Western music and culture, were banned, being labelled as "counter-revolutionary", "bourgeois", or "capitalist".

One of the earliest composers of revolutionary songs was Đinh Nhu (1910–1945). Trọng Tấn (born 1976) is considered the young "Hoàng tử nhạc đỏ" (Prince of Red Music).

References

Vietnamese music